Haverkamp is a toponymic surname. A haverkamp was a fenced field of oats or oat farm. Notable people with the surname include:

Anselm Haverkamp (born 1943), German-American philosopher and literary critic
Christina Haverkamp (born 1958), German activist
Egbert Haverkamp-Begemann (1923–2017), Dutch-American art historian
Maarten Haverkamp (born 1974), Dutch CDA politician
Roy T. Haverkamp (1924-2018), American diplomat
Siwart Haverkamp (1684–1742), Dutch classical scholar

References

Dutch toponymic surnames
Dutch-language surnames
German-language surnames
German toponymic surnames
de:Haverkamp